Faridabad Thermal Power Station is located in the New Industrial Township of the Indian city of Faridabad,  from the capital Delhi. The power plant is one of the coal-based power plants owned by Haryana Power Generation Corporation Limited. Presently the plant is shut down.

Power plant
Units 1 and 3 were phased out because of ageing. The power station has been shut down and decommissioned as of 2017.

Installed capacity

See also 

 Deenbandhu Chhotu Ram Thermal Power Station
 Panipat Thermal Power Station I
 Panipat Thermal Power Station II
 Rajiv Gandhi Thermal Power Station

References 

Coal-fired power stations in Haryana
Faridabad district
Energy infrastructure completed in 1974
1974 establishments in Haryana
20th-century architecture in India